Most streets of West Perth, Western Australia are separate from the streets of the Perth central business district.

See also 
 List of streets in Perth
 List of streets in East Perth
 List of streets and paths in Kings Park
 List of streets in Crawley and Nedlands
 List of streets in Bayswater, Western Australia
List of streets in Kardinya, Western Australia

References 

 
West Perth
West Perth streets
West Perth